Fly Baghdad is a private Iraqi airline, headquartered in Baghdad, with flights based at Baghdad International Airport. The airline restarted its operations on 14 February 2017. Fly Baghdad has 2 Boeing 737-700 and 1 CRJ-200 with an average aircraft age of approximately fourteen years. After the dissolution of old board, the new management rebuilt the company again.  The company slogan is Less Price... More Flights.

Destinations
Fly Baghdad is flying to the following destinations:

Fleet

Fly Baghdad operates the following aircraft :

References

Airlines of Iraq
Iraqi brands
Airlines established in 2015
Companies based in Baghdad
Iraqi companies established in 2015